Colin Patterson (born 3 March 1955) is a former  international rugby union player. He toured South Africa in 1980 with the British and Irish Lions and at the time played club rugby for Instonians. His son Johnny captained the Regent House Grammar School side that reached the Ulster Schools Cup final in 2008.

Patterson studied law at Bristol and played for English Universities and British Universities. He rejoined Instonians on his return to Ireland and was selected for Ulster and capped by Ireland B in 1977 before winning his first full cap for Ireland against New Zealand in 1978. He won eleven senior caps and scored five tries for Ireland. His career came to a premature end when he suffered a serious knee injury playing against Griqualand West during the 1980 British Lions tour to South Africa, after having been scrum-half in the first three internationals against South Africa.

Notes

1955 births
Living people
Irish rugby union players
Ireland international rugby union players
British & Irish Lions rugby union players from Ireland
Instonians rugby union players
Ulster Rugby players
Rugby union scrum-halves
Rugby union players from Belfast